1968 Olympics may refer to:

 1968 Summer Olympics, which were held in Mexico City, Mexico
 1968 Winter Olympics, which were held in Grenoble, France